David Nagy (February 16, 1981) is a singer, guitarist. He currently plays with his soloband. He was member of the Hungarian heavy metal band Pokolgép from 2001 to 2010, but penned lyrics for the 2000 album Csakazértis.
In February 2013 he started a new band with ex-Pokolgép drummer Csaba Czébely under the name of Helland.
The band released their debut album called Hellness in 2014. In 2014 he left the group to start a solo career.

Biography

Early life
David Nagy was born on February 16, 1981, in Budapest, Hungary.  He has an older sister. His parents both were fans of The Beatles's music. He found his father's old guitar in the house at the age of 10. He began taking classical guitar lessons at the local music school.  His early influences were ACDC's Angus Young and Slash. At age 13 he got to know Gábor Kukovecz, guitarist of Hungarian heavy metal band Pokolgép, and began to take private lessons from him.

Career
By the age of the 18, he was writing lyrics for the band, spending his time sitting in the corner of the band's rehearsal place. This album turned out to be Csakazértis.
Soon after its release, the band asked him to join the band as a full-time member. David spent 10 years with the band contributing lyrics and music for the albums:

 2000: Csakazértis -lyrics only
 2001: Ancient Fever (Csakazértis – English version)
 2001: Live (live)
 2002: Te sem vagy más
 2002: Momentum (Végtelen úton) (re-recorded ballads)
 2004: A túlélő
 2006: Oblatio (re-recorded songs, acoustic)
 2007: Pokoli mesék
 2010: Újratöltve-Live

In January 2011, due to musical and personal differences, he quit the band and moved to Los Angeles for 5 months where he wrote songs with Zoltán "Zoli" Téglás. After returning to Budapest he started working on a new band with ex-Pokolgép drummer Csaba Czébely under the name of Helland. The band released its first EP in June 2013. Their first full-length album, Hellness was released in 2014.

He has written songs and made guest appearances for various artists, including the title track song on the Joe Rudan album "Én ez vagyok" as well as providing solos on the Zoli Band album "Red and Blue".

Musical Influences
According to David he picked up the guitar after seeing ACDC's song Money talks on TV. He's other influences are Michael Schenker, Gary Moore, Zakk Wylde, Paul Gilbert, Dimebag Darrell, Black Sabbath, Randy Rhodes, etc.

Discography
Pokolgép
 2000: Csakazértis -lyrics only
 2001: Ancient Fever (Csakazértis – English version)
 2001: Live (live)
 2002: Te sem vagy más
 2002: Momentum (Végtelen úton) (re-recorded ballads)
 2004: A túlélő
 2006: Oblatio (re-recorded songs, acoustic)
 2007: Pokoli mesék
 2010: Újratöltve-Live
HELLAND
 2013: Helland – Helland EP
 2014: Helland – Hellness
Various
 2010: Zoli Band – Red & Blue
 2014: Rudán Joe – Én ez vagyok

References

External links
Helland's official website
 Helland's page on Facebook

1981 births
Heavy metal guitarists
Hungarian rock guitarists
Male guitarists
Hungarian songwriters
Living people
Lyricists
Writers from Budapest
21st-century guitarists
Hungarian male musicians